Aleksandr A. Chernov was a geologist and paleontologist from the Russian Empire and later the Soviet Union. He was made a Hero of Socialist Labor in 1957, and granted the title of Honoured Scientist of the RSFSR in 1946.

Chernov was born on July 11, 1877, in Solikamsk in the Solikamsky Uyezd of the Perm Governorate of the Russian Empire.

He studied at Perm Mens' Gymnasium. His field of work included geology. He worked for Moscow State University, for the Academy of Sciences of the USSR, and for the Faculty of Physics and Mathematics of Moscow Imperial University. 

He published more than 140 scientific papers,  mainly devoted to the study of geology and minerals of the Middle and Northern Urals, Pai-Khoi (Polar Urals), and Pechora Territory. The paleontological material he collected served as the basis for the Paleozoic stratigraphy of the western slopes of the Northern Urals and Pai-Khoi. In his early works, he studied the geology of the Kama region: "Essay on the geological structure of the environs of Solikamsk" (1888), "On the question of the conditions for the occurrence of the Kama salt-bearing strata" (1908) and others. He theoretically substantiated the existence of the Pechora coal basin.

He died on January 23, 1963, in Syktyvkar in the Komi Republic, Russia.

1877 births
1963 deaths
People from Solikamsk
People from Solikamsky Uyezd
Geologists from the Russian Empire
Soviet geologists
Professors of the Moscow State University
Heroes of Socialist Labour
Recipients of the Order of Lenin
Recipients of the Order of the Red Banner of Labour
Recipients of the Order of the Red Star